Leave It to Beaver is an American television situation comedy about an inquisitive and often naïve boy named Theodore "The Beaver" Cleaver (portrayed by Jerry Mathers) and his adventures at home, in school, and around his suburban neighborhood. The show was created by Amos 'n' Andy writers Joe Connelly and Bob Mosher. The series comprises 234, full-screen, black-and-white episodes, excluding the pilot. The show was televised from October 4, 1957 to June 20, 1963.

The pilot, titled "It's a Small World", aired on April 23, 1957. It featured Casey Adams as Ward Cleaver, and Paul Sullivan as Wally Cleaver. TV Land re-aired it on October 6, 2007, as part of their twenty-four-hour marathon to commemorate the show's 50th anniversary.

Universal Studios Home Entertainment has released seasons one and two of the series on DVD Region 1. The pilot episode is included on the season-one DVD. Shout! Factory released Season 3 on June 15, 2010, and the complete series set was released on June 29, 2010.

Series overview

Episodes

Pilot (1957)

Season 1 (1957–58)

Season 2 (1958–59)

Season 3 (1959–60)

Season 4 (1960–61)

Season 5 (1961–62)

Season 6 (1962–63)

References

External links 

 Leave It to Beaver on epguides

 01
Lists of American sitcom episodes
Leave It to Beaver